This is a list of notable people who have explicitly claimed and are considered by others to be the Avatars of the Supreme Being or of a more limited expansion of Ishvara or other expression of divinity. This list does not include the traditional  Dashavatara (ten avatars of Vishnu) of Hinduism.

Claimants 
 Meher Baba - "I am the Avatar of this Age!" "You know that you are a human being, and I know that I am the Avatar. It is my whole life!" "Irrespective of doubts and convictions, and for the Infinite Love I bear for one and all, I continue to come as the Avatar, to be judged time and again by humanity in its ignorance, in order to help man distinguish the Real from the false." He maintained he was the Avatar, God in human form
 Mother Meera - claims to be an avatar of Shakti, the primordial mother goddess. The sense of avatar as mother goddess is unique to the sect of Hinduism called Shaktism.
 Sathya Sai Baba - claimed to be an avatar of Shiva and Shakthi.
Kalki Bhagawan and Amma Bhagawan - This couple from South India claim to be the Kalki avatar of Vishnu and his consort Lakshmi respectively.
 Mirza Husayn 'Ali Nuri, Baháʼu'lláh (1817–1892), is regarded by his followers as the “reincarnation of Krishna” and the “Tenth Avatar” and the “Immaculate Manifestation of Krishna” according to Shoghi Effendi, the Guardian of the Baha'i Faith. He is also regarded as the fulfillment of the Messianic expectations of the other prophetic religions (Judaism, Christianity, Islam, Zoroastrianism and Buddhism).

See also
 List of Buddha claimants
 List of Mahdi claimants
 List of messiah claimants
 List of people who have been considered deities
 List of people claimed to be Jesus

References

Further reading 
''Encyclopedia of Reincarnation and Karma. Norman C. McClelland. McFarland 2011. .

Avatars
 
Lists of people associated with religion